The 1959 Irish presidential election was held on Wednesday,
17 June 1959. Éamon de Valera, then Taoiseach, was elected as president of Ireland. A referendum proposed by de Valera to replace the electoral system of proportional representation by means of the single transferable vote with first-past-the-post voting which was held on the same day was defeated by 48.2% to 51.8%.

Nomination process
Under Article 12 of the Constitution of Ireland, a candidate for president may be nominated by:
at least twenty of the then 207 serving members of the Houses of the Oireachtas, or
at least four of 31 councils of the administrative counties, including county boroughs, or
themselves, in the case of a former or retiring president.

Outgoing president Seán T. O'Kelly had served two terms, and was ineligible to serve again. On 27 April, the Minister for Local Government signed the ministerial order opening nominations, with noon on 19 May as the deadline for nominations, and 17 June set as the date for a contest. All Irish citizens on the Dáil electoral register were eligible to vote.

Éamon de Valera, who had served as President of Dáil Éireann and President of the Irish Republic from 1919 to 1922 during the Irish revolutionary period, as President of the Executive Council from 1932 to 1937, and as Taoiseach from 1937 to 1948, from 1951 to 1954, and again from 1957 until his election as president, was nominated by Fianna Fáil on 12 May. He had served as Fianna Fáil's leader since its foundation in 1926.

Seán Mac Eoin, a Fine Gael TD who had been the party's candidate in the 1945 presidential election, was nominated again by the party on 15 May.

During the campaign, the far-right micro-party Lia Fáil called on its followers to support Seán Mac Eoin over de Valera. The party gave 25 reasons for this position, with some of those reasons being that de Valera "was an alien" (de Valera had been born in the United States, but had been raised and living in Ireland since the age of 2), was a puppet of the British, that he was "the darling" of Protestants, Freemasons and the British Army, and that "his satanic lust for power motivates every act of his life". The paper reasons for supporting Mac Eoin were because he was "an honest-to-God Irishman of our own flesh and blood whose father and mother we know" and his military background.

Patrick McCartan, who had also been a candidate in the 1945 election and had served as a senator for Clann na Poblachta from 1948 to 1951, was nominated by two county councils only, short of the four required for nomination. Eoin O'Mahony also sought and failed to secure a nomination by county councils.

Éamon de Valera was inaugurated as president on 25 June.

Result

References

1959 elections in the Republic of Ireland
Presidential
Éamon de Valera
Presidential elections in Ireland
June 1959 events in Europe